Iberus is a peer-reviewed scientific journal published by the Sociedad Española de Malacología (Spanish Malacological Society), covering research in malacology. The journal covers research on molluscs, with emphasis on taxonomy. It was established in 1981 and the editor-in-chief is Serge Gofas (University of Málaga).

Abstracting and indexing
The journal is abstracted and indexed in Biological Abstracts, BIOSIS Previews, and The Zoological Record.

References

External links

Malacology journals
Academic journals published by learned and professional societies
Multilingual journals
Publications established in 1981